Mary Knight Benson was a Pomo woman who excelled in traditional basket making.  Her work is highly collectible and renowned for fine craftsmanship.  She and her husband, William Ralganal Benson, partnered as basket weavers, and their work is curated in major museums, their work excelled in traditional basket making.

Personal life
Mary Knight Benson  (1877-1930) was born to Sarah Knight, a Central Pomo speaker and master basket weaver.  The Pomo tribe was a group of indigenous people of California who traditionally resided in the coastal region of Northern California above San Francisco.  When she met William Benson, she was already a master basketmaker.  
William, a speaker of the Eastern Pomo language and also a master basket weaver was skilled in many other aspects of Pomo culture.  The couple lived most of their lives on Pomo tribal territory near Ukiah, California where William was an elder, band chief, and tribal historian.  As a couple, they became renowned for their basket-making. William served as an elder, band chief, and tribal historian. The couple's artistic work created a lot of success. The couple moved to Salt Lake Valley in 1852. Her brother named Charles and his family joined the family business in 1852 and traveled to Salt Lake Valley.  The Pomo people of California's coastal area above San Francisco were a group of indigenous people who lived in the Coastal area of Northern California.

Basketry reputation and recognition
The Bensons may have been the first California Indians who supported themselves solely by crafting and selling their baskets to collectors and museums.  Beginning with the Spanish mission period in California, the Pomo, like other tribes, suffered drastic declines in population, severe cultural destruction, and the loss of homeland.  As such, they began working as laborers on farms and ranches that occupied their traditional lands.  However, a market for genuine, traditional baskets opened in the 1880s and lasted until the 1930s. The baskets were usually covered with a layer of feathers.

She created a Pomo willow basket in 1929-1931 in Yokayo Rancheria, California. 

William and Mary Benson took advantage of this commercial opportunity.  While Pomo men did not traditionally make the kind of fine baskets demanded by the market, Mary helped him adapt his skill to the fine work done by women.  He was one of the few men who did so. Mary developed her skills which grew to an astounding level and were noted for focusing on perfection.  She produced baskets that reflected her skillful weaving technique, astute material selection, remarkably straight lines, complicated diagonals, and complex patterns.

Mary and William enjoyed significant success in their artist career of weaving Pomo baskets.  They traveled widely and developed relationships with collectors and art dealers.  The couple demonstrated their weaving skills at the Louisiana Purchase Exposition in Saint Louis in 1904.  They had their exhibit and jointly wove a basket that won the fair’s highest award.

Baskets made by William and his wife Mary are curated in museums such as the Smithsonian Institution, National Museum of the American Indian, and the Field Museum of Natural History and are known as some of the finest ever woven.

Footnotes

References

Books

Websites

 
 
 
 
 

Native American basket weavers
Pomo people
20th-century American women artists
Native American women artists
Women basketweavers
1877 births
1930 deaths
20th-century Native Americans
20th-century Native American women